The following are the football (soccer) events of the year 1987 throughout the world.

Events 
UEFA Champions League: Porto 2–1 Bayern Munich in the final at the Ernst Happel Stadium in Vienna.
UEFA Cup: Two legs; 1st leg, IFK Göteborg 1–0 Dundee United; 2nd leg, Dundee United 1–1 IFK Göteborg. IFK Göteborg wins 2–1 on aggregate.
Cup Winners' Cup: Ajax 1–0 Lokomotive Leipzig
Super Cup: Two legs; 1st leg, Ajax 0–1 Porto; 2nd leg, Porto 1–0 Ajax. Porto won 2–0 on aggregate
England - FA Cup: Coventry won 3-2 (aet) over Tottenham Hotspur
Copa Libertadores: Won by Peñarol after defeating América de Cali on the final playoff match by a score of 1–0.
25 July – In second ever FIFA U16 World Championship, the Soviet Union beat the surprise winners of two years ago, Nigeria, on penalties.
13 December – Portugal's Porto wins the Intercontinental Cup in Tokyo, Japan by defeating Uruguay's Peñarol in extra-time by a score of 2–1. The winning goal is scored by Rabah Madjer.

Winner club national championships

Asia 
 Qatar:
Qatar Stars League – Al-Sadd

Europe 
 England:
First Division – Everton
Second Division – Derby County
Third Division - AFC Bournemouth
Fourth Division - Northampton Town
FA Cup – Coventry City
League Cup – Arsenal
 France:
Division 1 – Bordeaux
 Italy:
Serie A and Italian Cup – Napoli
 Netherlands:
Eredivisie – PSV
KNVB Cup – Ajax
Eerste Divisie – Volendam
 Portugal:
Liga and Cup of Portugal – Benfica
 Scotland:
Premier Division – Rangers
First Division – Morton
Second Division – Meadowbank Thistle
Scottish Cup – St Mirren
Scottish League Cup – Rangers
 Spain:
La Liga – Real Madrid
Copa del Rey – Real Sociedad
 Turkey:
Premier Super League – Galatasaray
Turkish Cup – Gençlerbirliği

North America
 – Calgary Kickers (CSL)
 – Chivas Guadalajara
 – San Diego Nomads (WSA)

South America 
 Argentina:
Primera División – Rosario Central
 Bolivia:
Liga de Fútbol Profesional Boliviano – Bolívar
 Chile:
Primera División de Chile – Universidad Católica
 Colombia:
Fútbol Profesional Colombiano – Millonarios
 Brazil:
Brazilian Football Confederation – Sport Recife
Copa União – Flamengo
 Paraguay:
Liga Paraguaya – Cerro Porteño

International Tournaments 
 Copa América in Argentina (27 June – 12 July 1987)
 
 
 
 Pan American Games in Indianapolis, United States (9–21 August 1987)

National teams



Births 

 January 4 
 Kay Voser, Swiss footballer
 Danny Simpson, English footballer
 January 7 – Jimmy Smith, English footballer
 January 10 – Vicente Guaita, Spanish footballer
 January 12 – Andrey Buyvolov, Russian footballer
 January 21
 Andrei Cojocari, Moldovan international
 Alexander Dercho, German club footballer
 Henrico Drost, Dutch youth international
 Will Johnson, Canadian international
 Kevin Kratz, German club footballer
 Mulopo Kudimbana, Congolese international
 Danny Munyao, Zambian international
 Nyasha Mushekwi, Zimbabwean international
 January 24 — Wayne Hennessey, Welsh international footballer
 January 28 — Iván Emmanuel González, Paraguayan footballer
 February 14
 Edinson Cavani, Uruguayan footballer
 José Miguel Cubero, Costa Rican footballer
 February 27
 Scott Davies, English footballer
 Sandy Paillot, French footballer
 Maximiliano Moralez, Argentinian footballer
 March 12 – Omar Abdulrazaq, Syria footballer
 March 13 – Andreas Beck, German international footballer
 March 20 – Korkrirk Petchkongthong, Thai professional footballer
 March 20 – Bogdan Stoyanov, Bulgarian footballer
 March 31
Nordin Amrabat, Dutch footballer
Hugo Ayala, Mexican footballer
Amaury Bischoff, Portuguese footballer
Justin Braun, American soccer player
Carl Dickinson, English footballer
Eros Pisano, Italian footballer
Aridane Santana, Spanish footballer
 April 9 – Blaise Matuidi, French international footballer
 April 16 — Aaron Lennon, English international footballer
 April 22 — Mikel John Obi, Nigerian international footballer
 April 23 — Francesco Montella, Italian footballer
 May 4 — Cesc Fàbregas, Spanish international footballer
 June 12 — Antonio Barragán, Spanish and Galician footballer
 June 24
Serdar Güneş, Turkish footballer
Craig Henderson, New Zealand footballer
Josh Lillis, English footballer
Lionel Messi, Argentine international footballer
 June 26 — Samir Nasri, French international footballer
 July 2 — Esteban Granero, Spanish footballer
 July 25 — Eran Zahavi, Israeli footballer
 July 27 — Vasili Penyasov, former Russian professional football player
 July 28
 Yasser Corona, Mexican defender
 Yevhen Khacheridi, Ukrainian international
 Pedro, Spanish footballer
 August 19 – Richard Stearman, English footballer
 August 24
 Masaki Yamamoto, Japanese football player
 Ri Jun-il, North Korean football player
 September 9 — Abel Dhaira, Ugandan international footballer (died 2016)
 October 1 — Lionel Ainsworth, English footballer
 October 7 — James McArthur, Scottish international footballer
 October 11 — Timo Furuholm, Finnish international footballer
 December 5 – Tommy Fraser, English club footballer
 December 9 — Karim Benzema, French international footballer

Deaths

February
 February 2 – Carlos José Castilho, Brazilian goalkeeper, winner of the 1958 FIFA World Cup and 1962 FIFA World Cup. (59)

May
 May - Syd Hartley, English professional association football player (born 1914)
 May 23 - Ernst Nagelschmitz, German footballer (born 1902)

October
 October 23 – Alejandro Scopelli, Argentine/Italian striker, runner-up of the 1930 FIFA World Cup. (79)

References

External links
  Rec.Sport.Soccer Statistics Foundation
  VoetbalStats

 
Association football by year